Sai gork (also sai gok, sai kok or sai krok), also known as soured Lao sausage, is a sour sausage in Lao cuisine. The ingredients for sai oua (Lao sausage) and sai gork are mainly the same, but sai gork uses cooked Lao sticky rice as an additional ingredient in the filling. The sai gork is then allowed to "sour" or ferment at room temperature for several days. This style of Lao sausage can also be found in Northern and Northeastern Thailand where the Lao cultural and culinary influence have reached.

See also 
 Naem
 Sai krok Isan, the Northeastern Thai version of the sausage
 Sai oua
 List of sausages

References 

Lao sausages